Varsity (Hangul: 바시티) is a South Korean boy band formed by CSO Entertainment in 2017. They later signed with Jungle Entertainment. They debuted on January 5, 2017, with "U R My Only One".

Members

Current
 Junwoo (준우)
 Damon (데이먼)
 Xiweol (시월)
 Xin (씬)
 Jaebin (재빈)
 Anthony (앤써니)
 Dawon (다원)
 Manny (만니)

Former
 Kid (키드) — Leader
 Riho (리호)
 Seungbo (승보)
 Yunho (윤호)

Discography

Extended plays

Singles

References

K-pop music groups
Musical groups established in 2017
South Korean boy bands
South Korean dance music groups
South Korean pop music groups
Musical groups from Seoul
2017 establishments in South Korea